Ballophilus granulosus is a species of centipede in the genus Ballophilus. It is found in New Zealand. The original description of this species is based on specimens ranging from 16 mm to 40 mm in length with 53 to 71 segments.

References 

Ballophilidae
Animals described in 1936
Centipedes of New Zealand